Major-General David Charles Bullen-Smith  (23 October 1898 – 1970) was a senior British Army officer.

Military career
Bullen-Smith was born in 1898 and attended Wellington College, Berkshire. He then attended the Royal Military College, Sandhurst during the First World War, from where he was commissioned on 16 August 1916 into the King's Own Scottish Borderers. He was promoted to lieutenant on 16 February 1918.

Remaining in the army during the difficult interwar period, he became commanding officer of the 1st Battalion the King's Own Scottish Borderers in 1940 during the Second World War. He went on to be commander of the 219th Independent Brigade in June 1941, Commandant of Senior Officers' School in November 1941 and General Officer Commanding 15th (Scottish) Infantry Division in May 1942. After that he became General Officer Commanding 51st (Highland) Division in North-West Europe in August 1943 and led the division during the Normandy landings. After leading an unsuccessful operation to raid the Colombelles factory area on 10–11 July 1944, he was relieved of his command and, instead, became deputy director of Military Training at the War Office in August 1944. He retired in July 1946 and, having attained the age limit, ceased to belong to the Reserve of Officers on 23 October 1956.

References

Bibliography

External links
Generals of World War II

|-

|-

1898 births
1970 deaths
British Army generals of World War II
King's Own Scottish Borderers officers
Recipients of the Military Cross
British Army personnel of World War I
War Office personnel in World War II
People educated at Wellington College, Berkshire
Commandants of the Senior Officers' School, Sheerness
British Army major generals
Graduates of the Royal Military College, Sandhurst